Pooh and the Philosophers is a 1995 book by John Tyerman Williams, purporting to show how all of Western philosophy from the last 3,000 years was a long preparation for Winnie the Pooh. It was published in 1995 by Dutton in the United States and by Methuen in the United Kingdom, using A. A. Milne's fictional bear Winnie-the-Pooh, and is intended to be both humorous and intellectual.

Authorship and content
J. T. Williams explains a number of philosophical theories using many different Milne quotation, such as René Descartes's "I think therefore I am," and distills them down to a very simple level. Williams is a retired schoolteacher who lives in Trethevy, Cornwall.

Related works
Pooh and the Magicians (originally Pooh and the Ancient Mysteries)
Pooh and the Psychologists

See also

 The Tao of Pooh
 The Te of Piglet

Notes

External links
John Tyerman Williams

1995 non-fiction books
Winnie-the-Pooh books
Philosophical literature